Cedar Walton is an eponymous album by pianist Cedar Walton which was recorded in 1985 and released on the Dutch Timeless label.

Reception

Allmusic awarded the album 4½ stars. The Penguin Guide to Jazz wrote: "the material doesn't give anyone enough to bite down on and there's too much filling for too little substance".

Track listing 
All compositions by Cedar Walton except as indicated
 "Third Street Blues" – 7:13  
 "Magical Lady" (David Williams) – 7:30  
 "Short Comings" (Billy Higgins) – 5:42  
 "Voices Deep Within" – 8:50  
 "I'll Let You Know" – 7:24  
 "Bleeker Street Theme" – 5:06

Personnel 
Cedar Walton – piano 
David Williams – bass
Billy Higgins – drums

References 

Cedar Walton albums
1986 albums
Timeless Records albums